The unseasonable rain and hailstorm across all North India and its connected states caused heavy damage to the crops of the Rabi Harvest in March 2015. Usually this period of the year does not get rain but this year heavy rainfall destroyed most of the winter harvest that was near to being cut. It directly affected normal life, especially of farmers who lost their harvest for this season. Because of the crop damage on a large scale, the prices of basic food items increased. Approximately 106 lakh hectares harvest was damaged and 80 farmers attempted suicide in March alone. It was recorded as the wettest March in 48 years.

Impact
“Usually, from February, western disturbances tend to subside. But this year, not only were the disturbances more active, they extended up to April. Also, there was an induced low pressure, which pulled moisture both from the Bay of Bengal and the Arabian Sea. This led to heavy and frequent showers in March
In March, 62.5 millimetres of rainfall were recorded, almost 100 per cent more than normal (32.1 millimetres) and the highest in the past 100 years (in 1915, it was 78 millimetres). The showers and hail, which came at a time when the rabi crop was to be harvested, hit about 10 million hectares of the 60 million hectares of sown area. The standing wheat, mustard and chana crops were hit the hardest. Wheat crop in 21 per cent of the overall sown area has been completely damaged. The estimated loss to an average farmer affected by rains has been Rs 20,000 per acre but the government has announced a relief of just Rs 6,800 per hectare for rain fed areas."

Affected states and crops

Government response
The government of India raised the compensation for crop damage and made it easier for farmers to claim such compensation after unseasonal rains destroyed standing crops and brought parts of rural India to the brink of crisis. The government decided to increase the amount of compensation to affected farmers by 50 per cent over the existing level and also softened the norms for obtaining assistance.

References 

2015 disasters in India
Natural disasters in India
2015 natural disasters
Climate of India
March 2015 events in India
2015 meteorology